Blood Crime is a 2002 American made-for-television thriller film, starring James Caan and Johnathon Schaech. It was co-written and co-produced by Preston A. Whitmore II and directed by William A. Graham. The film was first aired at USA Network on September 13, 2002.

Plot
A homicide detective has problems with a local sheriff, after pummeling a man who supposedly attacked his wife while they were on vacation at the sheriff’s small town.

Cast
 James Caan as Sheriff Morgan McKenna
 Johnathon Schaech as Daniel Pruitt
 Elizabeth Lackey as Jessica Pruitt
 David Field as Jonah Ganz
 Sydney Jackson as Roy Biggs

Reception
Frank Veenstra from the blog "BobaFett1138" gave the film 4 out 10 and wrote: ""Blood Crime" has a bad written script. Well, perhaps bad is not the most correct word to use since the story is more just a highly unlikely one. You just never get sucked into it because it all and the way the story progresses seem so highly unlikely. You can say that I even was a bit annoyed by the movie its story at times. It isn't credible and has some gaping plot-holes." Scott Weinberg from "eFilm Critic" gave the movie only two stars, stating: "Blood Crime is an interesting movie, if only in one very specific and silly way: it pairs one legendary actor who really ought to know better (James Caan) with one chiseled B-level actor who not too long ago was considered a 'next big thing'." Robert Pardi from TV Guide gave "Blood Crime" two out four stars and wrote: "If Mark Lawrence Miller and Preston A. Whitmore's screenplay had focused more subtly on the wary relationship that evolves between the urban and rural lawmen, this would be a far more compelling film. As it stands, there are exciting sequences but the film overall is undermined by a protagonist whose decision to tamper with clues strains credulity."

References

External links
 
 

2002 television films
2002 films
2000s thriller films
American thriller television films
American prison films
Films directed by William Graham (director)
2000s American films